Eufemio Zapata Salazar (1873, Ciudad Ayala - June 18, 1917, Cuautla, Morelos) was a participant in the Mexican Revolution and the brother of Mexican revolutionary Emiliano Zapata. He was known as a womanizer, a macho man, and a very heavy drinker.

Eufemio Zapata was assassinated by General Sidronio Camacho on June 18, 1917 in Cuautla. This happened after, allegedly, Camacho argued that Eufemio had beaten his father - which would be illogical since Don Gabriel died around 1895.
Historian Édgar Castro Zapata has made some statements about the death of General Eufemio to remove the legend that overshadows the murder and makes him look like an angry and alcoholic man who beat elderly merchants for pleasure.

In this way, Castro Zapata affirms that a fact that marked the death of Eufemio Zapata was the knowledge of a telegram in which Colonel Sidronio Camacho and General Napoleón Caballero were invited to join the Carrarcista ranks and betray the Zapatista movement.
"Eufemio intercepted that telegram, but in his eagerness to intimidate Sidronius and Napoleon, he was killed on June 18, 1917 as a result of a bullet impact. His inert body was abandoned five kilometers from the city of Cuautla, and later taken to the Anenecuilco cemetery, in Villa de Ayala, Morelos.
The betrayals in the Zapatista ranks continued and in that crossfire a general who also served as leader of Mexican agrarianism lost his life: Eufemio Zapata.

In popular culture
Eufemio Zapata was portrayed by actor Anthony Quinn in the 1952 film Viva Zapata!, a role which earned him an Academy Award for Best Supporting Actor.

References

Sources
Villa and Zapata: A History of the Mexican Revolution by Frank Mclynn
Viva Zapata! (novel), John Steinbeck
Mexican Revolution of 1910 at www.latinoartcommunity.org
Biography in Spanish

Eufemio Zapata, more than the older brother of the Leader of the South

Zapatistas
1873 births
1917 deaths
People murdered in Mexico
Deaths by firearm in Mexico